Vavila (before 1485 – 1520) was the Metropolitan of Zeta from c. 1494 to 1504.

Biography
The first mention of Vavila dates to January 4, 1485, in the charter issued by Ivan Crnojević (r. 1465–1490); the Old Cetinje Monastery was built in 1484–85, at which time the Metropolitan of Zeta was Visarion, while Vavila was mentioned as his vicar bishop (1485). Vavila succeeded Visarion, though it is not known when exactly this would have taken place, as the oldest found source mentions Vavila as such in 1494.

Vavila blessed Hieromonk Makarije's Cetinje Octoechos, printed at the Crnojević printing house in 1494, in which he was mentioned as the Metropolitan of Zeta. In 1496, Prince Đurađ IV Crnojević of Zeta (r. 1489–1496) abdicated the rule to Stefan II Crnojević, an Ottoman vassal, and Zeta then became part of the Sanjak of Scutari of the Ottoman Empire in 1499.

In 1504, Roman is mentioned as the Metropolitan of Zeta. In 1514, Zeta was separated from the Sanjak of Scutari and established as the separate Sanjak of Montenegro, under the rule of Skenderbeg Crnojević. In 1516, Vavila was elected as ruler of Montenegro by its clans. This event marked the foundation of the Prince-Bishopric of Montenegro.

Vavila died in 1520.

References

Bishops of Montenegro and the Littoral
15th-century Eastern Orthodox bishops
16th-century Eastern Orthodox bishops
Ottoman period in the history of Montenegro
15th-century births
1520 deaths